Malacca Straits Mosque is a mosque located on the man-made Malacca Island in Malacca City, Malacca, Malaysia, which was opened on 24 November 2006 by the Supreme Ruler of Malaysia (Yang di-Pertuan Agong) Tuanku Syed Sirajuddin Syed Putra Jamalullail and was constructed with a cost of about MYR10 million. It was built using the mix of Middle Eastern and Malay craftsmanship and looks like a floating structure when the water level is high. Its structure has two intersecting archways lead to the main entrance and stained glass which covers the space in between the arches. The mosque compound has a 30-metre tall minaret that is also used as a lighthouse.

See also
 Islam in Malaysia

References

2006 establishments in Malaysia
Buildings and structures in Malacca City
Mosques completed in 2006
Mosques in Malacca
Mosque buildings with domes